Micromyrtus triptycha is a plant species of the family Myrtaceae endemic to Western Australia.

It blooms between April and December producing yellow-white-cream flowers.

It is found on sand plains, hills and slopes in the southern Wheatbelt region of Western Australia where it grows in gravelly, sandy or clay soils over laterite or ironstone.

References

triptycha
Endemic flora of Western Australia
Myrtales of Australia
Rosids of Western Australia
Plants described in 2006
Taxa named by Barbara Lynette Rye